The Men's parallel slalom competition at the FIS Freestyle Ski and Snowboarding World Championships 2021 was held on 2 March 2021.

Qualification
The qualification was started at 09:35. After the first run, the top 16 snowboarders on each course were allowed a second run on the opposite course.

Elimination round
The 16 best racers advanced to the elimination round.

References

Men's parallel slalom